Mara Cruz (Madrid, Spain; March 24, 1941) is a Spanish film actress.

Selected filmography
 The Warrior and the Slave Girl (1958)
 The Italians They Are Crazy (1958)
 The University Chorus (1960)
 Left Handed Johnny West (1965)
 Tall Women (1966)
 Los siete de Pancho Villa (1967)
 Dos cruces en Danger Pass (1967)

References

Bibliography

External links

1941 births
Living people
Spanish film actresses
People from Madrid